William Frank Blount, AM (born July 26, 1938) is an American businessman, and currently the chairman and CEO of venture capital firm JI Ventures, Inc. Blount previously served as chairman and CEO of Cypress Communications Inc., and director and CEO of Telstra Corporation Limited in Australia.

Early life and education
Blount received a B.S. in Electrical Engineering from the Georgia Institute of Technology in 1961, an M.B.A. from Georgia State University in 1969, and a SM (master's degree) in Management Science from the MIT Sloan School of Management in 1971.

Career
From 1993 to 1999 Blount served as Chief Executive Officer of Telstra Corporation in Australia. He was previously Group President of AT&T Corp. On June 9, 1999 he was appointed an Honorary Member of the Order of Australia (AM), "for service to business, particularly as the Chief Executive Officer of Telstra".

In 1999, Blount became affiliated with The Jordan Company, L.P., a private investment firm that specializes in buying and building businesses in partnership with management. 

Blount currently serves as a director of Caterpillar Inc., Entergy Corporation, Hanson plc, ADTRAN and Alcatel-Lucent.

References 

Living people
1938 births
Caterpillar Inc. people
Georgia State University alumni
Georgia Tech alumni
MIT Sloan School of Management alumni
American chief executives of financial services companies
Honorary Members of the Order of Australia
Telstra people